The field hockey tournament at the 1983 Pan American Games was the fifth edition of the field hockey event at the Pan American Games. It took place in Caracas, Venezuela from 15 to 26 August 1983.

Canada won their first gold medal by defeating the defending champions Argentina 3–1 in the final. Chile won the bronze medal by defeating the United States 1–0.

Results

Group stage

Group A

Group B

Fifth to eighth place classification

Seventh and eighth place

Fifth and sixth place

Medal round

Semi-finals

Bronze medal match

Gold medal match

Final standings

References
 Pan American Games field hockey medalists on HickokSports

1983
Events at the 1983 Pan American Games
Pan American Games
1983 Pan American Games